Horst Eylmann was a German politician of the Christian Democratic Union (CDU) and former member of the German Bundestag.

Life 
From 1983 to 1998, he was a member of the German Bundestag, where he was first Deputy Chairman of the Committee on Electoral Examination, Immunity and Rules of Procedure from 1990 to 1992 and Chairman of the Committee of Inquiry into Commercial Coordination and Alexander Schalck-Golodkowski from 1991 to 1992. He was then Chairman of the Committee on Legal Affairs from 1992 to 1998.

References 

1933 births
2014 deaths
Members of the Bundestag for Lower Saxony
Members of the Bundestag 1994–1998
Members of the Bundestag 1990–1994
Members of the Bundestag 1987–1990
Members of the Bundestag 1983–1987
Members of the Bundestag for the Christian Democratic Union of Germany